Martyn Lee (born 10 September 1980) is an English former professional footballer who played in the Football League for Wycombe Wanderers and Cheltenham Town. He is currently the first team coach at Isthmian League side Westfield FC.

References

1980 births
Living people
Sportspeople from Guildford
English footballers
Association football midfielders
Wycombe Wanderers F.C. players
Cheltenham Town F.C. players
Maidenhead United F.C. players
Kingstonian F.C. players
English Football League players
Footballers from Surrey